Too Much Coffee Man (TMCM) is an American satirical superhero created by cartoonist Shannon Wheeler. Too Much Coffee Man wears what appears to be a spandex version of old-fashioned red "long johns"  with a large mug attached atop his head. He is an anxious Everyman who broods about the state of the world, from politics to people, exchanging thoughts with friends and readers.

The strip is most often presented as a single page in alternative press newspapers, though occasionally the story arc stretches into multi-page stories. TMCM has appeared in comic strips, minicomics, webcomics, comic books, magazines, books, and operas. The Too Much Coffee Man comic book won the 1995 Eisner Award for Best New Series.

Publication history

Creation 
Too Much Coffee Man first appeared in 1991, in the Too Much Coffee Man Minicomic, as a self-promotion for Wheeler's book Children with Glue (Blackbird Comics, 1991). The minicomics, which appeared in many different formats, even one issued as a one-inch square, were self-published, photocopied, and handmade by Wheeler in initial runs of 300 black-and-white copies.

Wheeler said he created Too Much Coffee Man to make more accessible themes he had begun in a college newspaper. He said in 2011:

Newspaper strip 
Too Much Coffee Man started as a one-page ongoing strip running in The Daily Texan in 1991. Over time, it became syndicated to a number of alternative weeklies throughout the U.S.

With the January 23, 2006, installment, the "Too Much Coffee Man" strip was retitled "How to Be Happy, with Too Much Coffee Man". On February 6, 2006, the title was simplified to "How to Be Happy", and Too Much Coffee Man did not appear in the strip again until January 21, 2008.

Comics

Solo title 
Wheeler published four issues of the Too Much Coffee Man minicomic in 1991–1992.

Wheeler self-published the Too Much Coffee Man comic book via Adhesive Comics between 1993 and 2005. The first five issues were dated from July 1993 to February 1996. These were followed by three annual issues of Too Much Coffee Man's Color Special from 1996 to 1998. In July 1998, Adhesive released Too Much Coffee Man No. 8, thus skipping issues No. 6 and 7. After issue No. 10 (Dec. 2000), the comic became Too Much Coffee Man Magazine, featuring stories, articles, and reviews alongside TMCM material.

Appearances in other titles 
Too Much Coffee Man strips appeared in the Austin, Texas-based anthology, Jab issues #1–4 and No. 6, published by Wheeler's own imprint Adhesive Comics from 1992 to 1995.

In 1994 TMCM appeared in the independent anthology Hands Off!, published by Washington Citizens for Fairness.

From 1994 to 1996, Too Much Coffee Man stories ran in the Dark Horse Comics anthology series Dark Horse Presents, in issues #92–95, and #100–111.  Dark Horse collected all the TMCM stories from Dark Horse Presents in the 1997 special Too Much Coffee Man "Saves the Universe".

1997 was a banner year for Too Much Coffee Man, with stories in the SPX: Small Press Expo anthology, Caliber Press's Negative Burn No. 50, the Head Press anthology No Justice, No Piece!, and the trade paperback Wake Up and Smell the Cartoons of Shannon Wheeler, published by Mojo Press.

In 1998, TMCM stories were printed in Oni Double Feature No. 2 and Judge Dredd Megazine vol. 3, No. 41.

From 1999 to 2002, Too Much Coffee Man stories ran in the Dark Horse Comics anthology series Dark Horse Extra, in issues No. 8, 10–13, 41–43, and 48.

In 2011, TMCM appeared in the Madman 20th Anniversary Monster!, published by Image Comics, and War of the Independents No. 1, published by Red Anvil.

In 2013, TMCM was featured in a three-issue how-to guide on submitting comics to the digital comics platform ComiXology. In 2014, TMCM stories appeared in BANG! The Entertainment Paper #7–8.

Online 
With the earnings from a Converse shoe commercial, Wheeler purchased a computer, launched his website tmcm.com on December 7, 1995, and began posting his comics online. He continues to post new and newly colored Too Much Coffee Man cartoons on his website every week.

Plot and characters 
Through multi-layered narratives, the comic explores issues of politics and the toils of urban society, often through the lens of the comics scene and coffee shop culture. In addition to the titular character, the creator of the strip often appears as a character, as does a "reader" character.

Too Much Coffee Man — Although he spends most time in his apartment or at the local coffee shop debating with his often pessimistic cohorts, Too Much Coffee Man is capable of going into a "manic paranoid frenzy" in combat, allowing him to pulverize opponents. He gains his amazing powers from coffee and cigarettes – he distills his extra potent espresso mix in a secret laboratory above the coffee shop. TMCM rarely sleeps and his nerves are shot from an excess of caffeine. He has also been in outer space and in a U.S. prison. Visually, the character is a parody of superheroes, which since their inception have been colloquially referred to by industry professionals as "long-underwear characters". Too Much Coffee Man wears literal long underwear, dressing in what appears to be a spandex version of old-fashioned red "long johns"  (full-body underwear with a buttoned flap on the back for bodily functions) with a large mug attached atop his head; it remains unclear whether he is wearing it or whether it is physically part of him.

Too Much Espresso Guy — Too Much Coffee Man's cynical friend. The espresso cup atop his head is strapped on in an obvious way.

Too Much German White Chocolate Woman With Almonds — their mutual friend. She is pale-skinned, worries a lot, and has large almonds on her face.

Underwater Guy — another mutual friend, who wears a wetsuit with a diving snorkel and mask.

Mystery Woman — Too Much Coffee Man's secret love.

Trademark Copyright Man — Too Much Coffee Man's archenemy. They first fought when Too Much Coffee Man was sued by Trademark Copyright Man due to their initials both being TMCM and they both have a coffee cup strapped to their head, but Too Much Coffee Man presumably killed him after he ate his lawyer.

Collected editions 
 Too Much Coffee Man "Saves the Universe" (Dark Horse, July 1997)
Too Much Coffee Man's Guide for the Perplexed (Dark Horse, 1998) 
Too Much Coffee Man's Parade of Tirade (Dark Horse, 2000) 
Too Much Coffee Man's Amusing Musings (Dark Horse, 2001) 
How to be Happy (Dark Horse, 2005) 
Screw Heaven, When I Die I'm Going to Mars (Dark Horse, 2007) 
Too Much Coffee Man Omnibus (Dark Horse, August 2011)  — collects all previous Dark Horse collections
Too Much Coffee Man: Cutie Island and Other Stories (BOOM! Studios, March 2012)

In other media

Television
In 1994, Converse shoe company licensed the rights to use Too Much Coffee Man for a 15-second commercial spot, first airing during a Saturday Night Live episode. The character has also been used in advertising for Hewlett-Packard.
Marvel Comics and the cable television network Comedy Central were developing a potential animated series or special with the production company Nelvana in 2000 and 2001. However, the project was abandoned after both Wheeler and Comedy Central agreed that the script lacked quality.

Music
In 2000, jazz musician Bob Dorough recorded a CD entitled Too Much Coffee Man. The character appears on the cover, drawn by Shannon Wheeler, and there is a title track (originally intended to be music for an animated series based on the character) as well as a cover of the Richard Miles composition "The Coffee Song".

Opera
The Too Much Coffee Man Opera appeared on stage for the first time in 2006. Wheeler, fellow cartoonist Damian Willcox, and composer Daniel Steven Crafts adapted the strip into an opera. Too Much Coffee Man Opera debuted at Brunish Hall at the Center for Performing Arts in Portland, Oregon, on September 22, 2006. A sample performance, which preceded the debut, was given at the Opera America convention in Seattle, Washington. Wheeler later teamed with Portland-based comic Carolyn Main to write a second act. This new, extended version, dubbed Too Much Coffee Man: The Refill, debuted again at Brunish Hall in April 2008.

Miscellaneous

Artist Shannon Wheeler drew Too Much Coffee Man for an appearance on Rootless Coffee Co.'s HYPERSPACE coffee line.

References

External links

 Happy coffee
"Shannon Wheeler Too Much Coffee Man Omnibus: A caffeinated portrait of the cartoonist as a young man". The Willamette Week. September 14, 2011.

Interviews 
Acid Logic: Shannon Wheeler interview (August 12, 2002)
Transcript, interview from NextPlanetOver.com (March 1999)
"An interview with Shannon Wheeler". The Daily Cross Hatch. March 26, 2007.

Dark Horse Comics characters
Eisner Award winners for Best New Series
Parody superheroes
Satirical magazines published in the United States
Satirical comics
Male characters in comics
Male characters in advertising
Mascots introduced in 1991
Comics characters introduced in 1991
Comics adapted into operas
1991 comics debuts
2005 comics endings
Magazine mascots
Works about coffee